This is a list of electoral results for the electoral district of Fitzroy in Victorian state elections.

Members for Fitzroy

Election results

Elections in the 1960s

The two candidate preferred vote was not counted between the Labor and DLP candidates for Fitzroy.

Elections in the 1950s

 Two party preferred vote was estimated.

Elections in the 1920s

Elections in the 1910s

References

Victoria (Australia) state electoral results by district